Kirill Borisovich Startsev (born September 21, 1989) is a Russian professional ice hockey player. He is currently playing with PSK Sakhalin of Asia League Ice Hockey (ALIH).

Startsev previously played two games in the Russian Superleague for Avangard Omsk during the 2007–08 Russian Superleague season and two games in the Kontinental Hockey League for Metallurg Novokuznetsk during the 2013–14 KHL season.

References

External links

1989 births
Living people
Avangard Omsk players
HC Izhstal players
HC Ryazan players
HC Sarov players
Metallurg Novokuznetsk players
PSK Sakhalin players
Rio Grande Valley Killer Bees players
Russian ice hockey left wingers
Zauralie Kurgan players